The Beverly Railroad Bridge is a historic railroad bridge that now carries hikers, bicyclists, and pedestrians over the Columbia River near Beverly, Washington, United States. It was constructed by the Chicago, Milwaukee, St. Paul and Pacific Railroad (otherwise known as The Milwaukee Road) in 1909 during its Pacific Extension. In 1906, The Milwaukee Road began construction on its transcontinental rail line from Chicago, Illinois to Tacoma, Washington, which was completed three years later.

The spans include 14 Warren deck trusses, one Parker through truss, and deck plate girders on the approaches. When the railroad electrified in the 1920s, supports for the catenary were added to the bridge.

When the railroad ceased using electric locomotives in 1972, the catenary was removed, but the supports were kept in place.

After the railroad went bankrupt in the mid-1970s and abandoned its lines in the Pacific Northwest in 1980, the bridge and adjoining right-of-way were taken over by the State of Washington in lieu of back taxes owed by the railroad.

The bridge was listed in the National Register of Historic Places in 1982 because of its association with The Milwaukee Road.

The bridge is on the route of the Palouse to Cascades State Park Trail, which follows the Milwaukee Road right-of-way across Washington. The bridge was extensively renovated, and re-opened for trail use in April 2022. One construction worker died during the rehabilitation project from a fall.

Notes

References
Soderberg, Lisa. Beverly Railroad Bridge. HAER Inventory, Historic American Engineering Record. Washington, D.C.: U.S. Department of the Interior, 1979.
Soderberg, Lisa. . National Register of Historic Places Inventory - Nomination Form. On file at the National Park Service, Washington DC.

External links

Chicago, Milwaukee, St. Paul and Pacific Railroad
Bridges completed in 1909
Former railway bridges in the United States
Railroad bridges in Washington (state)
Bridges over the Columbia River
Bridges in Grant County, Washington
Transportation buildings and structures in Kittitas County, Washington
Railroad bridges on the National Register of Historic Places in Washington (state)
National Register of Historic Places in Kittitas County, Washington
National Register of Historic Places in Grant County, Washington
1909 establishments in Washington (state)
Steel bridges in the United States
Warren truss bridges in the United States
Parker truss bridges in the United States